"Call It What You Want" is the second and final single by Above the Law from their second album Black Mafia Life. It features 2Pac and Money-B. The music video for the single features cameos from Treach, Eazy-E, and MC Ren.

Charts

References

External links
Genius: Call It What You Want - Lyrics

1992 singles
1992 songs
Tupac Shakur songs
Above the Law (group) songs
Ruthless Records singles
Songs written by Tupac Shakur